The women's marathon 10 kilometre event at the 2020 Summer Olympics was held on 4 August 2021 at the Odaiba Marine Park. It was the fourth appearance of the event, having first been held in 2008.

Ana Marcela Cunha won with a time of 1:59:30.8, becoming the first Brazilian woman swimmer to win a gold medal in the Olympics. Former Olympic gold medalist Sharon van Rouwendaal of the Netherlands finished second, with Kareena Lee of Australia taking the bronze.

Qualification

 
The event featured a field of 25 swimmers:

10: the top-10 finishers in the 10 km races at the 2019 World Aquatics Championships (maximum of 2 per NOC)
9: the top-9 finishers at the 2020 Olympic Marathon Swim Qualifier, open only to NOCs with no qualified swimmers (maximum of 1 per NOC)
5: one representative from each FINA continent (Africa, Americas, Asia, Europe and Oceania), based on the finishes at the 2020 Olympic Qualifier
1: from the host nation (Japan) if not already qualified. If Japan had qualified for the race by other means, this spot would have been allocated back into the general pool above (2020 Olympic Marathon Swim Qualifier).

Competition format

Unlike all of the other swimming events in the pool, the men's and women's marathon 10 kilometre races are held in open water. No preliminary heats are held, with only the single mass-start race being contested. The race is held using freestyle swimming, with a lack of stroke regulations.

Schedule
All times are Japan Standard Time (UTC+9)

Results

References

Women's 10000 metre marathon
Olympics
Women's events at the 2020 Summer Olympics
2021 in women's swimming